The 1985 Masters Tournament was the 49th Masters Tournament, held April 11–14 at Augusta National Golf Club in Augusta, Georgia.

Bernhard Langer won the first of his two major championships, both Masters, two strokes ahead of runners-up Seve Ballesteros, Raymond Floyd, and Curtis Strange. A 69 (−3) on Saturday put Floyd in the lead after 54 holes at 212 (−4); Strange was a stroke back, with Langer and Ballesteros two strokes back. Despite an opening round 80, Strange led by three strokes with six holes to play in the final round, but made key bogeys at 13 and 15 when his attempts to reach both greens in two shots found water instead and finished two strokes back. It was Strange's only top-5 finish at Augusta, but he won consecutive U.S. Opens in 1988 and 1989.

Langer, age 27 and dressed in red, birdied four of the last seven holes to win the green jacket. The second champion from Europe, he had consecutive rounds of 68 (−4) on the weekend to become the first winner of a major from Germany (then West Germany). Langer won a second green jacket eight years later in 1993.

Field
1. Masters champions
Tommy Aaron, George Archer (11,12), Seve Ballesteros (3,10,11), Gay Brewer, Billy Casper, Charles Coody, Ben Crenshaw (8,12,13), Raymond Floyd (4,8,13), Doug Ford, Bob Goalby, Jack Nicklaus (2,4,8,11,12), Arnold Palmer, Gary Player (8,10), Craig Stadler (11,12,13), Art Wall Jr., Tom Watson (2,3,8,9,11,12,13), Fuzzy Zoeller (2,9,11,13)

Jack Burke Jr., Ralph Guldahl, Claude Harmon, Ben Hogan, Herman Keiser, Cary Middlecoff, Byron Nelson, Henry Picard, Gene Sarazen, and Sam Snead did not play.

The following categories only apply to Americans

2. U.S. Open champions (last five years)
Larry Nelson (4,8,11)

3. The Open champions (last five years)
Bill Rogers

4. PGA champions (last five years)
Hal Sutton (9,10,12), Lee Trevino (9,10,12)

5. 1984 U.S. Amateur semi-finalists
Jerry Haas (a), Sam Randolph (a), Randy Sonnier (7,a), Scott Verplank (6,7,a)

6. Previous two U.S. Amateur and Amateur champions
Jay Sigel (7,a)

7. Members of the 1984 U.S. Eisenhower Trophy team
John Inman (a)

8. Top 24 players and ties from the 1984 Masters Tournament
Andy Bean (9,12), Ronnie Black (11), Rex Caldwell, Fred Couples (9,12), Danny Edwards, David Edwards (12), Jay Haas (9,13), Hale Irwin (9), Tom Kite (11,12,13), Wayne Levi (11,12), Mark Lye, Larry Mize (10), Gil Morgan (12,13), Calvin Peete (10,11,12,13), Jack Renner (12), Payne Stewart (12)

9. Top 16 players and ties from the 1984 U.S. Open
Lennie Clements, Peter Jacobsen (11,12), Mark McCumber (11), Johnny Miller, Mark O'Meara (11,12), Tom Purtzer, Tim Simpson, Curtis Strange (11,12,13), Jim Thorpe, Lanny Wadkins (10,11,12,13)

10. Top eight players and ties from 1984 PGA Championship
Gary Hallberg (12), Scott Simpson (11,12)

11. Winners of PGA Tour events since the previous Masters
Woody Blackburn, Bob Eastwood (12), Hubert Green, Scott Hoch (12), Billy Kratzert, Corey Pavin (12), Joey Sindelar

12. Top 30 players from the 1984 PGA Tour money list
Gary Koch, Bruce Lietzke, John Mahaffey

13. Members of the U.S. 1983 Ryder Cup team
Bob Gilder

14. Foreign invitations
Isao Aoki (9), Ian Baker-Finch, Nick Faldo (8,11), David Graham (2,8), Bernhard Langer, Sandy Lyle, Tsuneyuki Nakajima, Greg Norman (9,11,12), José María Olazábal (6,a), Sam Torrance, Denis Watson (11,12)

Numbers in brackets indicate categories that the player would have qualified under had they been American.

Round summaries

First round
Thursday, April 11, 1985

Source:

Second round
Friday, April 12, 1985

Source:

Third round
Saturday, April 13, 1985

Source:

Final round
Sunday, April 14, 1985

Final leaderboard

Sources:

Scorecard

Cumulative tournament scores, relative to par
{|class="wikitable" span = 50 style="font-size:85%;
|-
|style="background: Red;" width=10|
|Eagle
|style="background: Pink;" width=10|
|Birdie
|style="background: PaleGreen;" width=10|
|Bogey
|}

References

External links
Masters.com – Past winners and results
GolfCompendium.com – 1985 Masters Tournament
Augusta.com – 1985 Masters leaderboard and scorecards

1985
1985 in golf
1985 in American sports
1985 in sports in Georgia (U.S. state)
April 1985 sports events in the United States